In Search of the Lost Divine Arc is an album by Acid Mothers Temple & the Melting Paraiso U.F.O. released by Important Records in 2013. The album is available on CD and as a deluxe blue vinyl double-LP, limited to 200 copies.

Track listing

Personnel
 Tsuyama Atsushi : bass, voice, flute, pipe
 Higashi Hiroshi : synthesizer
 Shimura Koji : drums
 Tabata Mitsuru : guitar, guitar-synthesizer, maratab
 Kawabata Makoto : guitar, bouzouki, electric sitar, hurdy-gurdy

Technical personnel
 Kawabata Makoto - production, engineering and mixing
 Yoshida Tatsuya - digital mastering

References

Acid Mothers Temple albums
2013 albums
Important Records albums